The Club Atlético Guayaquil (Barcelona SC "B") is a soccer club based in the Tarqui parish in Guayaquil, Ecuador.

Overview
It is composed of the two divisions under age 18 and under age 20 of the Barcelona Sporting Club, which serve as a kind of farm teams for Barcelona while playing in a lower-division league known as Segunda Categoría "A". The players of the Club Atlético Guayaquil are trained by Peruvian manager Hernán Saavedra so they can later play for Barcelona's main team. They play against teams like Club de Deportes Paladín, Liga Deportiva Universitaria Estudiantil, Asociación Deportiva Naval, Club 9 de Octubre, Círculo Deportivo Everest, Club Sport Patria and Club Sport Norte América.

Stadium information
Name: Estadio Monumental Isidro Romero Carbo
City: Guayaquil
Capacity: 89,932
Inauguration: December 27, 1987
Field size: 105 m by 70 m

Football clubs in Ecuador
Sport in Guayaquil
2005 establishments in Ecuador
Association football clubs established in 2005